My Home Village (1949), directed by Kang Hong-sik,  is a film in the war film genre, the first film to be made in the then newly independent Democratic People's Republic of Korea (North Korea). The film portrays the liberation of Korea from Japanese colonial rule in 1945.

Background
Kim Il-sung, the leader of the Korean Communist Party during the fight to liberate Korea from Japanese colonialism, was determined that cinema should play a central role in "ideological guidance" of his newly liberated country and eagerly accepted Soviet funding and technicians to set up the National Film Production Center. Their first production was My Home Village. The film was shot on 10 standard 35 mm film reels in black and white. Its running time is 101 minutes.

Plot
The film opens with a shot of Mount Paektu, the snow-capped volcano which is the holy mountain considered to be the origin of the Korean race, giving emotional basis for Kim's anti-Japanese guerrilla group. In fact, however, a scale-model of the mountain was used. The story concerns Gwan Pil, a poor farmer who is deprived of his land by an evil landlord and put in a Japanese prison. There he meets an agent of Kim Il-sung's . The two stage a riot and break out of prison to join the guerrillas. The guerrillas blow up a Japanese train which crashes through a railway bridge. Kim's army liberates Gwan Pil's home village, and he leads the fight to create a new society there. In the presentation of the liberation of Korea in 1945, there was no mention of American defeat of Japan or of the Soviet invasion but showed the liberation of Korea as the work of Kim Il Sung's guerrilla fighters working on their own.

Propaganda
North Korean sources tell that Kim Il-sung's son, Kim Jong-il, the future leader of the country, attended a preview of the film. Even at the age of seven, the story goes, he handed critical notes to the filmmakers pointing out that although there was snow falling, none could be seen on the heads or shoulders of the characters, and that the snow was clearly cotton wool, not real snow.

See also

 List of North Korean films

Notes

References

External links
 
 
 

1949 films
Korean-language films
North Korean drama films
1940s historical films
1949 war films
Korean black-and-white films
Korean War films
Guerrilla warfare in film